SYRANO (Système Robotisé d'Acquisition pour la Neutralisation d'Objectifs, "Robotic   acquisition system for neutralization of targets") is the first operational battlefield robot of the French military.

SYRANO was designed by a consortium of CGEY, THALES, GIAT Industries and SAGEM to collect information in combat zones, especially in urban combat conditions. It is based on the Wiesel AWC of the German Army.

External links 
  checkpoint-online.ch
 nap.edu
 defense-update.com

Armoured fighting vehicles of France
Military robots
Unmanned ground combat vehicles
Robots of France